Life with Boys is a Canadian teen sitcom that originally aired in Canada on YTV from September 2011 to August 2013. It follows 14-year-old Tess Foster as she navigates her way through the turmoil of teen life while living at home with her single, overprotective dad and three brothers. Although Tess adores the four important men in her life, they do have four totally different perspectives. Despite the shortcomings of being the only girl in a male household, the boys can sometimes offer solid advice. Whether it’s building up the courage to talk to a boy, dealing with an obnoxious one, or coping with the repercussions of being the only girl on the boys’ wrestling team, Life with Boys sheds a comedic light on many of life’s difficult moments.

Series overview

Episodes

Season 1 (2011–12)
Note: This show was apparently never broadcast in proper order, neither in Canada nor in the US. The production code numbers reflect the order in which the episodes were produced.

Season 2 (2012–13)

References

External links
 

Life with Boys
Life with Boys
Lists of Canadian sitcom episodes